Bülent Şahinkaya (1 January 1948 - 29 June 2009), also known as Küçük Bülent, was a Turkish former professional footballer. Şahinkaya was the captain of Trabzonspor when they were promoted to the Süper Lig for the first time.

Personal life
Şahinkaya was one of 7 children, 6 sons and 1 daughter. His father İbrahim and eldest brother Yılmaz were amateur footballers in their youth. His brothers Coşkun and Güngör were professional footballers who also played for Trabzonspor. Şahinkaya died on 29 June 2009, and was buried in Istanbul.

Honours
Trabzonspor
TFF First League: 1973-74

Galatasaray
Turkish Cup: 1975=76

References

External links
Mackolik Profile

1948 births
2009 deaths
Sportspeople from Trabzon
Turkish footballers
Association football midfielders
Süper Lig players
Trabzonspor footballers
İstanbulspor footballers
Galatasaray S.K. footballers